Gigantolaelaps is a genus of mites in the family Laelapidae. It is found in the fur of cricetid rodents, most often from the tribe Oryzomyini, from South America north to the southern United States. They are large (>1 mm) and darkly colored and have a complex life cycle.

Species
Gigantolaelaps aitkeni
Gigantolaelaps amazonae
Gigantolaelaps barrerai
Gigantolaelaps boneti (from Peromyscus mexicanus, Handleyomys chapmani, Megadontomys cryophilus, Peromyscus melanocarpus, and Oryzomys couesi in Oaxaca; includes G. tropedai)
Gigantolaelaps brachyspinosus (from Holochilus brasiliensis)
Gigantolaelaps canestrinii
Gigantolaelaps fonsecai (incertae sedis)
Gigantolaelaps gilmorei
Gigantolaelaps goyanensis (includes G. strandtmanni)
Gigantolaelaps guimaraesi
Gigantolaelaps inca
Gigantolaelaps intermedia
Gigantolaelaps mattogrossensis (includes G. cricetidarum)
Gigantolaelaps maximus (incertae sedis)
Gigantolaelaps oudemansi
Gigantolaelaps peruviana
Gigantolaelaps striatus
Gigantolaelaps tiptoni
Gigantolaelaps versteegi
Gigantolaelaps vitzthumi (includes G. bahiensis and G. bipilosus)
Gigantolaelaps wolffsohni Fonseca, 1939 (includes G. butantanensis and G. comatus)

References

Literature cited
Carmichael, J.A., Strauss, R.E. and McIntyre, N.E. 2007. Seasonal variation of North American form of Gigantolaelaps mattogrossensis (Acari: Laelapidae) on marsh rice rat in southern coastal Texas. Journal of Medical Entomology 44(1):80–84.
Estébanes-González, M.L. and Cervantes, F.A. 2005. Mites and ticks associated with some small mammals in Mexico (subscription required). International Journal of Acarology 31(1):23–37.
Furman, D.P. 1972. Laelapid mites (Laelapidae: Laelapinae) from Venezuela. Brigham Young University Science Bulletin 17(3):1–58.

Laelapidae
Parasites of rodents
Acari genera